Al Mafjar is an abandoned village in Qatar, located in the municipality of Ash Shamal in the north. There are plans to redevelop ruins of the ancient village as a tourist attraction. Umm Tais National Park and Ar Ru'ays are nearby.

Etymology
Al Mafjar roughly translates to 'bomber'. There is a high ground to the north of the village which has long prevented seawater from washing in, but when sea levels rose unexpectedly, the seawater "exploded" and spread around the village, thus giving it the name 'Al Mafjar'.

Gallery

See also
Natural areas of Qatar

References

Al Shamal